Cedar Swamp Wildlife Area is a state wildlife area located in New Castle County, Delaware, along shore of the Delaware Bay.

Much of the area is a transgressive brackish marsh. It is part of the Northeastern coastal forests ecoregion.

References

External links
 Cedar Swamp Wildlife Area - EcoDelaware

Protected areas of Delaware
Protected areas of New Castle County, Delaware